The Green Squad is a French animated television series, produced by Gaumont Alphanim. It is based from the French comic book series called "Les Sauvenature". It has been shown on Starz Kids & Family in the United States from March 16, 2013 to June 11, 2016 also known as Savage Family Wild.  The Green Squad is the name of a network created by three siblings, Claire, Julian and Thomas Savage along with their pet Wifi, whose mission is to protect plant and animal species, their environments and different kinds of discoveries. Thus, they travel around the world as they're job is to protect endangered animals and save Earth's landmarks and artifacts. They embark on their extraordinary adventures as they discuss each other through a worldwide blogging network to save the planet's natural sites.

The English dub was recorded in Canadian studio.

Characters 
Claire Savage She's a natural born leader of the Green Squad.
Julian Savage He's the only entertaining one who takes pictures with animals.
Thomas Savage He designed the Green Squad blog on the computer.
Wifi The pet ferret who accompanies the Green Squad.
Mr. and Mrs. Savage The parents of Claire, Julian and Thomas. They accompany them on their adventures.
Julia She's a friend of Mr. and Mrs. Savage. She talks to them about lions.
Mark He's the uncle of Claire, Julian and Thomas. Who sometimes accompany them on their adventures.
Jowandi He's the ranger of Koala Reserve.
Bruce Lecter He's the poacher of koalas whom kidnapped and setting the bush on fire.
Mike He's the neighbor of Mark as he is the Australian hunter. He cares about the marsupials of the outback.
Betaring He's a good friend of Mr. and Mrs. Savage who lives in the rainforest in Indonesia. He has some flowers from the forest to help medicine.
Sampa She is Betaring's wife.
Max Riley He's the engineer on the construction site of the rainforest in Indonesia. He wants to dig out the rainforest to build a road, but eventually, Betaring saves his son Jess with flowers so that he can divert the road to another direction away from the rainforest.
Jess Riley He's a son of Max Riley who have asthma attack.
George He guides The Green Squad of the caribous in Alaska that one of them is covered in oil.
Raul Betonas He is a ranger from Cuba who wants to build hotels by cutting trees down thus making hummingbirds fly away. Eventually, he was bitten by a dangerous animal.
Jorge He is the owner of the Hummingbird Hotel who invites The Green Squad to spend a few nights at his hotel.
Joseffa She is Jorge's daughter of the Hummingbird Hotel.
Charlie Rainbow He is a guide of the Grand Canyon who takes care of the Condors.
Professor Ron Phillips He's the professor from Wyoming University who studies and researches ferrets. He gave Wifi to the Green Squad for all times.
Jimmy Snake He is from the Shoshone tribe who keeps the ferrets under his protection. He works with Professor Philips to watch over ferrets.
Doug He's guides the Green Squad to make sure the wolves are safe.
Tony He's the photographer and capture a photo moment of Claire with the White Wolf.
Janiki He's the caretaker and researcher of crocodiles from India.
Admiral Lumet He's from the navy base that can guide The Green Squad to find the giant squid on his submarine.
Steve He's a friend to The Green Squad and sends a waterproof camera to film the giant squid.
Joao He's loves snorkeling under the sea and discusses with The Green Squad about saving the dolphins.

International titles 
Savage Family Wild (American English title)
Les Sauvenature (French title)
Das Green Team (German title)
Zielony patrol (Polish title)
Green Power הכוח הירוק (Hebrew title)

Episode list
Pandas in Danger
The Caged Dolphins
Beware of Wolves
Theft of the Condor
Saving the Elephants
Panic on the Aral Sea
Iguana Park
Park Poachers
SOS Bonobos
Caspian Sea Mission
The Turtle of the Egg
The Fishing Dolphins
Ferret Fancy
The Great Green Wall
The Pangolin Smugglers
The Great Golden Turtle
The Night of the Fishing Cat
Oil in Alaska
The Whale's Song
Sharks in Danger!
The Flight of the Pelicans
Revenge of the Flying Foxes
Hummingbird Hotel
Hunt for the Anaconda
A Threat to Otters
Stopover in Borneo
Deep Sea Monster
Trafficking on the Net
Heads of Gold
Sperm Whale Rescue
Jungle Toads
Blades of Danger
Hero of the Altiplano
King of the Circus
Fire in Madagascar
Wind Power!
Spring Into Action!
Polear Bear Emergency
Gharial Tears
The Treetop Raft
The Courage of Penguins
Fury of the Tiger
Water for Everyone!
The Orang Rimbas' Treasure
Fire in the Australian Bush
Long Live the Butterflies!
The Sengi Forest
The Rhinoceros Bride
Reef Rash
The Last of the Sirens
Seahorse Aid
Chameleon Raid

International broadcasts

References

External links 
Series profile at Gaumont Animation.
 

2010s French animated television series
2010 French television series debuts
2010 French television series endings
French children's animated adventure television series
Starz original programming
Gaumont Animation